Linda White (born c. 1960) is an Australian politician. She is a member of the Australian Labor Party (ALP) and was elected to the Senate as the party's lead candidate in Victoria at the 2022 federal election, to a term beginning on 1 July 2022. She was a lawyer and trade unionist before entering politics, including as assistant national secretary of the Australian Services Union (ASU).

Early life
White studied law and commerce at the University of Melbourne.

Career
White worked as a solicitor for ten years before joining the Australian Services Union (ASU). She served as assistant national secretary with responsibility for "the union's national strategy in the private sector including the airline industry, IT and call centre industries and the non-government social and community services (SACS) sector".

In 1993, White became a director of the Victorian Legal Industry Superannuation Scheme, which later merged into Legalsuper. She has also served as a director of the Royal Botanic Gardens Victoria and the Australian Centre for the Moving Image.

Politics
White was elected to the Australian Labor Party National Executive in 2006. She was appointed to the board of the Chifley Research Centre, the party's think tank, in 2013 and became chair in 2015.

In March 2022, White won ALP preselection as the party's lead Senate candidate in Victoria at the 2022 federal election and was elected to a term commencing on 1 July 2022. She is a member of the Labor Left and is the de facto successor to Kim Carr on the ticket, receiving the support of the United Workers Union in her preselection contest against Josh Bornstein.

References

 

Labor Left politicians
Living people
Year of birth missing (living people)
Australian solicitors
University of Melbourne alumni
Australian Labor Party members of the Parliament of Australia
Australian women lawyers
Australian women trade unionists
Members of the Australian Senate
Members of the Australian Senate for Victoria
Women members of the Australian Senate